The 2010–11 EHF Champions League was the 51st edition of Europe's premier club handball tournament and the eighteenth edition under the current EHF Champions League format. THW Kiel were the defending champions. The final four was played on 28–29 May 2011 at the Lanxess Arena at Cologne, Germany.

FC Barcelona defeated BM Ciudad Real in the final to win the title for the 8th time.

Draw
The draw for the group stage took place at the Liechtenstein Museum in Vienna on 22 June 2010. A total of 24 teams were drawn into four groups of six. Teams were divided into four pots, based on EHF coefficients. Clubs from the same pot or the same association cannot be drawn into the same group.

Each team played against each other in its group twice. The top two in each group proceeded to the knockout stage, and the third-placed teams entered the EHF Cup's Winners Cup Round of 32.

Qualification stage 
A total of eight teams took part in the Qualification Tournaments. The clubs were drawn into two groups of four. The winner of Qualification Group 1 qualified into Group B, the winner of Qualification Group 2 qualified into Group C. Play was scheduled at 3/4/5 September 2010. The matches of Group 1 were played at Bregenz, Austria. Group 2 played their games at Porto, Portugal.

Groups

Group 1 

All times are local (UTC+2)

Group 2 

All times are local (UTC+1)

Wild Card Round 
Four teams participated played for one place in EHF Champions League Group A. The games were played at the Europahalle in Karlsruhe, Germany.

All times are local (UTC+2)

Group stage

Groups

Group A 

All times are local

Group B 

All times are local

Group C 

All times are local

Group D 

All times are local

Knockout stage

Last 16
The draw was held on March 7, 2011 at 19:00 in Vienna, Austria. The first leg was played on 24–27 March 2011 and the second leg on 31 March–3 April 2011.

First match

Second match

Quarterfinals
The draw was held on April 4, 2011 at 18:30 in Vienna, Austria. The first leg was played on 20–24 April 2011, the second leg at 27 April–1 May 2011.

First match

Second match

Final four
The draw was held on 2 May 2011.

Semifinals

Third place game

Final

Top scorers 

Source:

References

External links 
 EHF Champions League website

 
Champions League
Champions League
EHF Champions League seasons